"Futari" (Us) is Jun Shibata's 16th single. It was released on May 28, 2008 and peaked at #15.

Track listing

Futari (ふたり; Us)
Takaramono (宝物; Treasure)

Charts

References

External links
https://web.archive.org/web/20161030094458/http://www.shibatajun.com/— Shibata Jun Official Website

2007 singles
Jun Shibata songs
2007 songs
Victor Entertainment singles